Robert Nikolaevich Mshvidobadze (born 17 August 1989 in Georgia) is a Russian judoka of Georgian descent. He is the 2017 European gold medalist in the 60 kg division.

He participated at the 2018 World Judo Championships, winning a medal.

References

External links
 

1989 births
Russian male judoka
Living people
Universiade medalists in judo
Russian sportspeople of Georgian descent
Universiade bronze medalists for Russia
Medalists at the 2011 Summer Universiade
Judoka at the 2020 Summer Olympics
Olympic judoka of Russia